The 2012–13 Hong Kong FA Cup is the 38th season of Hong Kong FA Cup. It is a knockout competition for all the teams of the 2012–13 Hong Kong First Division League. Starting from this season, the format will change into a two-legged home-and-away ties competition. The winner will guarantee a place in the 2013 Hong Kong AFC Cup play-offs.

Calendar

Bracket
The following bracket doesn't show first round matches.

Fixtures and results

First round

Quarter-finals

Semi-finals

Final

Remarks:
1 The capacity of Aberdeen Sports Ground is originally 9,000, but only the 4,000-seated main stand is opened for football match.

Scorers
The scorers in the 2012–13 Hong Kong FA Cup are as follows:

6 goals
  Christian Annan (Wofoo Tai Po)

4 goals
  Au Yeung Yiu Chung (South China)

3 goals
  Yago González (Kitchee)

2 goals
  Cheng Lai Hin (South China)
  Jaimes McKee (Sun Pegasus)

1 goal

  Miroslav Saric (Biu Chun Rangers)
  Sandro (Citizen)
  Huang Yang (Kitchee)
  Pablo Couñago (Kitchee)
  Lo Kwan Yee (Kitchee)
  Alessandro Celin (South China)
  Dhiego de Souza Martins (South China)
  Itaparica (South China)
  Lee Hong Lim (South China)
  Mauro Rafael da Silva (South China)
  Luk Michael Chi Ho (South China)
  Sean Tse (South China)
  Ticão (South China)
  Jonathan Carril (Southern)
  Landon Lloyd Ling (Southern)
  Chan Pak Hang (Sun Pegasus)
  Igor Miović (Sun Pegasus)
  Ju Yingzhi (Sun Pegasus)
  Lee Wai Lun (Sun Pegasus)
  Xu Deshuai (Sun Pegasus)
  Vladimir Karalić (Sun Pegasus)
  Beto (Tuen Mun)
  Daniel Goulart Quevedo (Tuen Mun)
  Diego Eli Moreira (Tuen Mun)
  Alex Tayo Akande (Wofoo Tai Po)

Own goals
1 goal
  Clayton Michel Afonso (Wofoo Tai Po)

Prizes

External links
FA Cup - Hong Kong Football Association

Fa Cup
Hong Kong FA Cup
2014